The 2018 Silverstone GP3 Series round was the fourth round of the 2018 GP3 Series. It was held on 7 and 8 July 2018 at Silverstone Circuit in Silverstone, United Kingdom. The race supported the 2018 British Grand Prix.

Classification

Qualifying

Feature race

Sprint race

Standings after the event 

Drivers' Championship standings

Teams' Championship standings

 Note: Only the top five positions are included for both sets of standings.

References

|- style="text-align:center"
|width="35%"|Previous race:
|width="30%"|GP3 Series2018 season
|width="40%"|Next race:

Silverstone
GP3
GP3 Silverstone